Stamitz was the surname of a family of German Bohemian musicians, the principal members of which were:

Johann Stamitz (1717–1757), Czech-German composer, founder of the Mannheim school
Carl Stamitz (1745–1801) German composer, son of Johann
Anton Stamitz (1750–c.1800), son of Johann

See also
 7623 Stamitz, a main-belt asteroid

Czech-language surnames